Matthias Höpfner (born 30 December 1975 in Erfurt) is a German bobsledder who has competed since 1995. He won two medals at the 2008 FIBT World Championships in Altenberg, Germany with a gold in the mixed bobsleigh-skeleton team event and a bronze in the four-man event.

Höpfner also finished fifth in the two-man event at the 2006 Winter Olympics in Turin.

References
2006 bobsleigh two-man results
FIBT profile
Official website 

1975 births
Bobsledders at the 2006 Winter Olympics
German male bobsledders
Living people
Olympic bobsledders of Germany
Sportspeople from Erfurt